Debra Susan "Debbie" Goad (February 13, 1954 – July 20, 2000) was an American journalist and assistant editor of the magazine Answer Me! Her husband, Jim Goad, was the magazine's primary writer and editor. She also contributed to the zine Temp Slave!

Goad grew up in a Jewish family in the Coney Island neighborhood of Brooklyn, meeting Jim Goad while he was living in New Jersey. In 1995, Goad and her husband Jim were charged with one felony count of promoting pornography because of offensive content in Answer Me! magazine, they faced a maximum sentence of five years in jail and a $10,000 fine. They were found not guilty.

Jim and Debbie Goad divorced in 1997, around the same time she was diagnosed with ovarian cancer.  She died in July 2000, aged 46, from ovarian cancer in Multnomah County, Oregon. Her mother had reportedly also died from the same disease and Goad reportedly wished to be cremated, but her brother, Dr. Mitchell Rosalie, a physician from New York City, was reportedly unable to locate her will and she was interred next to their mother's grave.

Works
 Best of Temp Slave!, edited by Jeff Kelly (1997), .

References

External links
 Jim Goad's personal website - "Why I resisted entering a public feud with a cancer patient"
 "In Memory of Debbie Goad"

1954 births
2000 deaths
People from Coney Island
Jewish American journalists
American women journalists
American magazine publishers (people)
Deaths from ovarian cancer
People from Multnomah County, Oregon
Deaths from cancer in Oregon
20th-century American non-fiction writers
20th-century American women writers
20th-century American Jews